Michał Gałecki (born 27 January 1996) is a Polish professional footballer who plays as a midfielder for IV liga club Unia Turza Śląska.

Club career
Gałecki began his career at Gosław Jedłownik and Naprzód Czyżowice. In 2011, he joined Arka Gdynia youth team, and in November 2012 he played reserve team football. On 11 May 2013, he made his I liga debut at the Stadion GOSiR, in a 3–1 win against Okocimski KS Brzesko. In August 2013, he had a trial spell with Football League Championship club Watford. On 31 January 2014, he signed for II liga side Rozwój Katowice on loan until the end of the 2013–14 season.

On 11 August 2015, Gałecki moved to newly promoted Rozwój on a permanent deal, for whom he played for one season. In July 2016, he signed a contract with I liga club Sandecja Nowy Sącz, where he became part of the squad that earned promotion to Ekstraklasa for the first time in club's history. He made his Ekstraklasa debut on 21 October 2017 in a 1–1 home draw against Cracovia.

On 21 July 2018, he signed a contract with Motor Lublin. On 13 June 2019 he joined II liga club GKS Katowice.

On 30 July 2022, after spells at KSZO Ostrowiec and Podhale Nowy Targ, Gałecki joined III liga club Odra Wodzisław Śląski.

On 3 March 2023, Gałecki moved to fifth division side Unia Turza Śląska for an undisclosed fee.

International career
Gałecki has represented Poland from under-17 to under-19 level. He made his first and only appearance for the Poland national under-19 football team on 10 October 2013 in a friendly home match to Lithuania in Inowrocław.

References

External links
 
 

1996 births
Living people
Polish footballers
Association football midfielders
Poland youth international footballers
Arka Gdynia players
Rozwój Katowice players
Sandecja Nowy Sącz players
Motor Lublin players
GKS Katowice players
Odra Wodzisław Śląski players
Ekstraklasa players
I liga players
II liga players
III liga players